kykNET is a South African  Afrikaans-language television channel. Owned by pay-TV operator M-Net, it was launched on the DStv satellite service in October 1999. On 16 July 2014 DStv announced that kykNET would be broadcast in high-definition from 12 August 2014.

A kykNet International service is available online to subscribers in selected countries in North America, Europe and Australasia via the Showmax platform.

It was also previously available in the UK, where it was launched on TalkTalk's IPTV service, TalkTalk Plus TV, in October 2013. However, it was dropped by TalkTalk in December 2015.

Channels 
kykNET
kykNET HD
kykNET&kie
kykNET NOU!  
KykNet Lekker
fliekNET

Programmes

Arendsvlei
Binnelanders
Boer Soek 'n Vrou
Bravo!
BVP:Krieket
Dagbreek
Die Edik van Nantes
Die GROOT ontbyt
Die Woord Oordenking
DKNT
Dwaalster
eNuus
Fiesta
Fynskrif
Geloof, Hoop En Liefde
Getroud met Rugby - Die Sepie
Glamguru
Groen Namibië
Hier Gaan Ons Alweer!
Insig
Jan Braai vir Erfenis
Jou Show
Jukebox
Koowee
Kwêla
La't Wiel
Ontbytsake
Republiek van Zoid Afrika
Robinson
Skole Top 10
 Sylvan (TV series)
Toks 'n Tjops
Woef & Kie
Afrikaanse Idols
Amalia
 'n Ander Wêreld
Bloedbroers
Boerekos
Buurtwag
Debra Deel
Die Nataniël Tafel
Doen met 'n Miljoen!
Fotostories
Geraldine die Tweede
Groen
Geure uit die Vallei
Hoor-Hoor!
Hartland
Impressario
King Hendrik
Kobra Elf
Koekedoor
Kokkedoor
Lagnes
Liriekeraai
Maatband
Mazda Avontuur Zone
Megaboere
Molly en Wors
Munisipaliteit van Gwarra Gwarra
Orion
Orkney Snork Nie
Ouverture
Pandjieswinkelstories
Proesstraat 
Rian
Roer Met Die Sterre
Safari 4x4 Roetes
Sandra op 'n drafstap
Sewe Sakke Sout
SleepTV
Sterlopers
Suidooster
SuperRugby
Thomas
Trompie
Tuine en Tossels
Vallei van Sluiers
Vastrap
Vat jou goed en trek!
Vetkoekpaleis
Villa Rosa
Wilde Engel
Kyk wie Praat
Dierepraters
Yskas Trauma (Die Uitnodiging)
Kwarantyn
Maak my Famous
Prontuit
Wie Word 'n Miljoenêr?

Kyknet lekker is available on DStv access but not on other packages. Kyknet en kie, Kyknet nou, en Kyknet via is on DStv access, family, compact, compact+ and DStv premium, while Kyknet 144 HD is available on DStv premium and compact plus. The Flieknet channel is available on all packages for R100 extra as a addon. It is available on DStv premium For free.

See also
 List of South African television channels
 Television in South Africa

References

External links
 Official Website

Television channels and stations established in 1999
Television stations in South Africa
Afrikaans-language television